Gods of Dharmapuri (shortened known as G.O.D) was a 2019 Telugu-language crime web series, starring Raj Deepak Shetty, Sruthi Jayan, Satya Dev and Karthik Rathnam. The series was directed by Anish Kuruvilla and produced by Radhika Lavu.

Cast 
 Raj Deepak Shetty as Pratap Reddy (10 episodes)
 Sruthy Jayan as Saroja (10 episodes)
 Satya Dev as Venu Reddy (6 episodes)
 Karthik Rathnam as Ravi Reddy (5 episodes)
 Vijay Adhiraj as Vengal Reddy (6 episodes)
 Chandini Chowdary as Swapna (6 episodes)
 Surya Sreenivas as Pasha 
 John Kottoly as Ranga Rao (6 episodes)
 L.B. Sriram as DN Reddy (6 episodes)
 Samyukta Hornad as Divya Matthews (5 episodes)
 Anish Kuruvilla as Mr. Rao (4 episodes)
 Baladitya as Satyanand (1 episode)
 Jagadeesh Prathap Bandhari as Chalapathi

Episodes

Reception 
Hemanth Kumar CR writing his review for The News Minute, wrote: "The series is a roller-coaster ride, and Anish Kuruvilla has a stern control over the narrative [...] However, once the story crosses the tipping point, it turns into a rewarding experience for all the emotional investment that it demands from the viewers."

Pratyush Parusuraman of Film Companion stated: "The beats of the story are inherently dramatic, but in the hands of Anish Kuruvilla, it also becomes incredibly stylish, with vignette frames, yellow flares, and a rousing score."

123Telugu.com, rated the series 2.5/5 and wrote: "Gods of Dharmapuri is a well-made web series with a rustic backdrop and gritty performances. The world of Dharmapuri, performances, and narration are good assets."

References

External links 
 
Gods of Dharmapuri (G. O. D.) on ZEE5

Indian web series
Telugu-language web series
ZEE5 original programming
2019 Indian television series debuts
2019 Indian television series endings
2019 web series debuts
2019 web series endings
Television shows set in Andhra Pradesh